Larry Gould is an American bridge player.

Bridge accomplishments

Wins

 North American Bridge Championships (1)
 Spingold (1) 1974

Runners-up

 North American Bridge Championships (3)
 Grand National Teams (1) 1983 
 Mitchell Board-a-Match Teams (1) 1973 
 Spingold (1) 1977

Notes

American contract bridge players